Nora Cano (born Nora Anaís Cano Luna on in Mexico City, Mexico) is a Mexican actress and singer. She known for music reality show Codigo F.A.M.A. who finished in 10th position.

Biography 
In 2004 she played Lechugona in Misión S.O.S produced by Rosy Ocampo.

As a singer she has participated in diverse musical projects, in the Codigo F.A.M.A. contest, recorded CD with their participation, later due to the success of the telenovela Alegrijes y rebujos they were recorded two disks called "Disco Alegrije" and "Disco Rebujo" besides making a promo of the discs "Navidad Rebujo" and "Navidad Alegrije" where they recorded 4 carols as well as concerts in the most important stages of Mexico Estadio Azteca, National Auditorium and the same Zócalo of the Capital before 140 thousand attendees, also participated in Teletón Mexico of 2003 and were the lucky ones to record the theme "Lo hacemos todos".

Filmography

Discography
Código Fama (2003)
Disco Alegrije (2003)
Disco Rebujo (2003)
Navidad Alegrije (2003)
Navidad Rebujo (2003)
Alegrijes y Rebujos en concierto DVD (2004)

References

External links 
 

1994 births
Living people
Mexican telenovela actresses
Mexican child actresses
Mexican television actresses
Mexican child singers
Actresses from Mexico City
Singers from Mexico City
21st-century Mexican actresses
People from Mexico City
21st-century Mexican singers